The Natalma Stakes is a Canadian Thoroughbred horse race held annually at Woodbine Racetrack in Toronto, Ontario. Run in mid-September, the Grade I race is run at a distance of one mile (8 furlongs) on turf and is open to two-year-old fillies. In 2016, the purse was increased to Can$250,000.

Part of the Breeders' Cup Challenge series, the winner of the Natalma Stakes automatically qualifies for the Breeders' Cup Juvenile Fillies Turf.

The race is named in honor of Natalma, the Virginia-bred mare who was the dam of Northern Dancer, one of the most influential sires in Thoroughbred history. Natalma is a member of the Canadian Horse Racing Hall of Fame.

Inaugurated in 1965, the Natalma Stakes was raced on dirt at a distance of  miles until 1968 when it was switched to the track's turf course. In 1980 the distance was modified to its present one mile.

The race was run in two divisions in 1979, 1983–1986, 1988. 1990–1995, 1997, 1998, 1999, 2001, 2002.

The Natalma was a Grade III race for many years, then became Grade II in 2012. In 2016, it became a Grade I stakes race. Several prominent fillies have competed in the Natalma, including Breeders' Cup winners Stephanie's Kitten, Dayatthespa and Catch A Glimpse.

Records
Speed  record: 
 1:33.70 – La Pelosa (2018)

Most wins by a jockey:
 5 – Todd Kabel (1993, 1996, 1997, 2000, 2002)

Most wins by a trainer:
 7 – Mark Casse (2006, 2007, 2011, 2012, 2014, 2015, 2016)

Most wins by an owner:
 5 – Sam-Son Farm 1986, 1990 (two divisions), 1992, 2000)

Natalma Stakes

See also
 List of Canadian flat horse races

References

 The Natalma Stakes at the NTRA

Turf races in Canada
Grade 1 stakes races in Canada
Flat horse races for two-year-old fillies
Breeders' Cup Challenge series
Woodbine Racetrack
Recurring sporting events established in 1965